CALM M5 is the ISO 21215 standard that incorporates WAVE (WAVE PHY/MAC is IEEE 802.11p standard) and adds the following features:
 Global (European) 5 GHz spectrum
 Regulatory domain (border) management
 Directivity and EMC control
 Regional DSRC cooperation
 Multiple radios/interfaces/antenna management through network connection
 GPRS/UMTS/+++ network interconnectivity

See also 
Common technical regulation
IEEE 802.11p

References

Status of Project IEEE 802.11p
 Bob Williams, Intelligent Transport Systems Standards, p. 221, Artech House, 2008 .
 Piyushimita (Vonu) Thakuriah, D. Glenn Geers, Transportation and Information: Trends in Technology and Policy, p. 24, Springer, 2013 .

IEEE 802.11